Gerald Wells (? – 1943) was a Royal Navy officer who served as the Director General of the Egyptian Ports and Lighthouses Administration after his retirement in 1930.

He commanded the battleship  in 1927–1929.

Citations

Bibliography
 

1943 deaths
Royal Navy officers of World War I